9200 Sunset (formerly Luckman Plaza) is a commercial office building at 9200 and 9220 Sunset Boulevard at the west end of the Sunset Strip in West Hollywood, California.

Designed by Charles Luckman, the project consists of two office buildings totaling  of office and restaurant space, which are connected by a central lobby.

History

The first building, originally constructed in 1964, is shaped like a triangle and is three stories tall. It once served as headquarters for Charles Luckman and Associates.

The second building, which consists of 14 stories and fronts Sunset Boulevard, was completed as an office tower in 1971. Luckman later added a penthouse floor on top of the building, which served as his personal residence.

The Luckman family owned 9200 Sunset from its initial construction until 2006, when it sold the project to the Mani Brothers Real Estate Group for an estimated $160 million.

Renovation
In 2009, architect Stephen Kanner completed a multimillion-dollar overhaul of the project, reorganizing and upgrading the common area space, and enclosing the open-air plaza at street level. The re-cladding, re-skinning of the exterior and new glass and glazing was performed by Diamond National Glass.

Tenants
9200 Sunset is regarded as one of the "top entertainment office properties" in Los Angeles, and is home to many companies from the entertainment industry, including Ford Models, Abrams Artists, AtEntertainment and Media Talent Group, among others. Mosaic Los Angeles, Sotheby's auction house and Comerica are also listed as tenants.

Innovative Dining Group’s BOA Steakhouse opened its flagship restaurant in the Spring of 2009 at the street level, which feature  of indoor and outdoor patio dining space in the former open-air plaza.

In the spring of 2010, the Soho House opened the West Hollywood branch of their private, members-only club on the top two floors in the Penthouse space which was the Luckman residence.

References

Office buildings completed in 1964
Office buildings completed in 1971
Skyscraper office buildings in Los Angeles
Buildings and structures in West Hollywood, California